Thoressa decorata, the decorated ace, is a butterfly belonging to the family Hesperiidae. It was first described by Frederic Moore in 1881 and is endemic to Sri Lanka in the Indomalayan realm.

References

e
Butterflies described in 1881